Fallen Angel is a 2003 Hallmark Hall of Fame television film starring Gary Sinise and Joely Richardson. It would be rerun in December 2004 and shown since on the Feeln on-demand movie service which shows many Hallmark Hall of Fame productions. It is based on the novel of the same name by Don Snyder, who also wrote the teleplay.

Plot
Successful California attorney Terry McQuinn (Sinise) looks back on his childhood in Maine. He's the son of a widowed caretaker who is too engrossed in his work to spend much time with his son, possibly out of incurable grief following the early death of Terry's mother. When Terry's father dies, he returns to Maine to take care of and settle his father's small estate. While there, he also tends a house his father cared for when Katherine Wentworth (Richardson), a New York social worker whose parents owned it before their divorce, decides to show the house to her adopted blind daughter, Olivia (Jordy Benattar) and calls to ask Terry to re-open the house.

Terry has flashed back to his boyhood and his original meeting with Katherine as a young girl when her parents came to the home one winter. He remembers going with Katherine and her father, a former professional football player, to deliver Christmas presents to hospitalised children, something her father did every year, until this night—after the deliveries, her father's car skidded on an icy road and inadvertently killed a mother and her child. Though police ruled it an accident and planned not to pursue charges, Katherine's father disappeared completely. Terry also discovers his own father kept many pictures of their little family for years after his mother died.

When he meets Katherine again, Terry is taken by her warmth and her blind daughter's love of life, and learns her long lost father isn't dead as his brother (Gordon Pinsent) made known but, rather, alive and homeless, after having worked many years at the hospital where he still donated Christmas presents annually to children there. Terry becomes uncertain whether to tell Katherine her father is still alive, and Katherine is uncertain about falling in love with Terry.

Cast
Gary Sinise as Terry McQuinn
Joely Richardson as Katherine Wentworth
Dave Nichols as Charles Wentworth
Michael Rhoades as Mac McQuinn
Gordon Pinsent as Warren Wentworth
Jordy Benattar as Olivia
Jake Brockman as young Terry
Ryan Simpkins as young Katherine
Rick Roberts as Charles at 30
Alisa Wiegers as Katherine's mother

Reception
Fallen Angel was nominated for a prime time Emmy award for its music score by Ernest Troost. Sinise, Richardson, and Benattar won as actors for Character and Morality in Entertainment Awards in 2005, as did SNyder (teleplay), director Michael Switzer, and producer Anne Hopkins.

References

External links

2003 television films
2003 films
2003 romantic drama films
Hallmark Hall of Fame episodes
American romantic drama films
Films directed by Michael Switzer
American drama television films
2000s American films